Matoi is a village in the Malerkotla district of Punjab, India. Formerly a part of the Sangrur district, it is located in the Malerkotla tehsil.

Demographics
 India census, Matoi had a population of 1,693. Males constitute 53.10% of the population and females 46.90%. Matoi has an average literacy rate of 74.67%: male literacy is 82.72%, and female literacy is 65.40%. In Matoi, 9.98% of the population is under 6 years of age.

References

Villages in Malerkotla district